The 1051st (QUEZON) Technical & Administrative Services Unit, 105th Technical & Administrative Services Group, known officially as First Force Support Unit, is one of two TAS Forward Operating Base Units of the 105th Technical and Administrative Services Group (Reserve) of the AFP Reserve Command, and is based in Quezon City. The unit provides combat support and service support services to the 1502nd Infantry Brigade (Ready Reserve) of the Army Reserve Command.

The unit is a technical service unit, which means it provides various medical, engineering, legal and religious services in support of the various maneuver units of AFP Reserve Force within the area of Quezon City particularly units of the 1502nd Infantry Brigade (Ready Reserve), 15ID(RR), ARESCOM and the 11th Air Force Group (Ready Reserve), 1AFW(R), AFRESCOM.

The Commissioned Officer Corps
Most of the officers of the 1051TASU,105TASG, AFPRESCOM are directly commissioned through AFP Circular Nr. 4 and 6 and may come from any of the following professions, :
 Lawyers and Paralegal Specialists (Judge Advocate General Service)
 Medical Doctors (Medical Corps)
 Nurses (Nurse Corps)
 Dentists (Dental Service)
 Veterinarians (Veterinary Corps)
 Licensed Teachers (Corps of Professors)
 Allied Medical, Business, and Mass Communication Specialists (Medical Administrative Corps)
 Licensed Engineers (Corps of Engineers)
 Ordained Chaplains (Chaplain Service)

Organization
The following are the units that are presently placed under operational control of the 1051st QC Technical & Administrative Services Unit.

Base Units
   Headquarters & Headquarters Service Company

Attached Units
   "B" TAS Company
   "C" TAS Company

Operations
 Disaster SAR, Relief and Rehabilitation Operations (TF Glenda) (16 Jul 14 - 17 Jul 14)
 Tree Planting CMO Operations (GHQ-AFP) (02 Aug 14 - 06 Sep 14)
 Medical & Dental Civic Action Program (MEDCAP) (Bgy Pansol, Quezon City) (05 Apr 14)
 Disaster SAR, Relief and Rehabilitation Operations (TF Mario) (19 Sep 14 - 21 Sep 14)
 Tree Planting CMO Operations (Bgy UP Village, Quezon City) (21 Sep 14)
 Security Augmentation Operations (Maginhawa Food Festival) (11 Oct 14)
 Security Augmentation Operations (75th QC Anniversary Float Parade) (12 Oct 14)
 Clean-up CMO Operations (Bgy Tumana, Marikina) (18 Oct 14)
 Medical & Dental Civic Action Program (MEDCAP) (Bgy Kamuning, Quezon City) (08 Feb 15)
 AFP JTF-NCR Contingent 2nd Rescue March Challenge (Manila) (26 Apr 15)
 Brigada Eskwela (ENCAP) (Culiat HS, Quezon City) (18 May 15)
 Medical & Dental Civic Action Program (MEDCAP) (Bgy Olandes, Marikina) (25 Jul 15)
 Medical & Dental Civic Action Program (MEDCAP) (Caloocan HS, Caloocan) (02 Aug 15)
 Medical & Dental Civic Action Program (MEDCAP) (Bgy Nagkaisang Nayon, Quezon City) (05 Sep 15)
 Medical & Dental Civic Action Program (MEDCAP) (Bgy Tatalon, Quezon City) (12 Sep 15)

Gallery

See also
 AFP Reserve Command
 1502nd Infantry Brigade (Ready Reserve)
 201st Infantry Battalion (Ready Reserve)
 202nd Infantry Battalion (Ready Reserve)
 22nd Infantry Division  (Ready Reserve)

References
Citations

Bibliography

 General Orders activating QC TAS Unit of 105TASG, AFPRESCOM
 AFPRESCOM Official Site
 The AFPRESCOM Training Group, AFP-MOT Manual, 2001, AFPRESCOM.

Company sized units
Reserve and Auxiliary Units of the Philippine Military
Military units and formations established in 2014